Anything Might Happen is a 1934 British crime film directed by George A. Cooper and starring John Garrick, Judy Kelly and Martin Walker. It was made as a quota quickie at Twickenham Studios for release by the American company RKO.

Cast
 John Garrick as Nicholson / Raybourn  
 Judy Kelly as Kit Dundas  
 Martin Walker as Kenneth Waring  
 Aubrey Mather as Seymour  
 D.J. Williams as Brown  
 Albert Whelan as Strickland

References

Bibliography
 Low, Rachael. Filmmaking in 1930s Britain. George Allen & Unwin, 1985.
 Wood, Linda. British Films, 1927-1939. British Film Institute, 1986.

External links

1934 crime films
1934 films
British crime films
Films directed by George A. Cooper
Films shot at Twickenham Film Studios
British black-and-white films
1930s English-language films
1930s British films
Quota quickies